McKeel is a surname. Notable people with the surname include:

 Seth McKeel (born 1975), American politician
 Walt McKeel (1972–2019), American baseball player

See also
 McKeel Academy of Technology, a high school in Florida, United States
 McKeen (surname)